Reinaldo Felisbino, a.k.a. Lela (born 17 April 1962) was a Brazilian football player.

Felisbino was born in Bauru, São Paulo, Brazil.  He played as a right-winger, beginning and ending his career with Esporte Clube Noroeste in Bauru.  He also wore the shirt of Fluminense Football Club, Inter de Limeira and Coritiba Foot Ball Club.

He won the Campeonato Brasileiro title in 1985 as captain of Coritiba, the greatest accomplishment in his playing career.

He is the father of players Alecsandro and Richarlyson.

References

1962 births
Living people
People from Bauru
Brazilian footballers
Coritiba Foot Ball Club players
Fluminense FC players
Central Sport Club players
Esporte Clube Noroeste players
Campeonato Brasileiro Série A players
Association football midfielders
Footballers from São Paulo (state)